Encephalography may refer to:

Electroencephalography
Hemoencephalography
Magnetoencephalography
Pneumoencephalography